The Portugal–Spain football rivalry (also known as The Iberian War or The Iberian Derby) is one of the oldest football rivalries at a national level. It began on 19 December 1921, when Portugal lost 1-3 to Spain at Madrid in their first ever international friendly game. Portugal lost their first matches, with their first draw (2–2) only coming in 1926. Portugal's first win came much later (4–1) in 1947.

Both belong to the strongest football nations of the world, and have met a total of 40 times (of which 11 matches were competitive) which resulted in 6 victories for Portugal, 17 draws, and 17 victories for Spain.

Background

The rivalry between two countries goes back to 1581, when the king Henry of Portugal died with no heir and it triggered a succession crisis. Where the main claimants to the throne were Philip II of Spain and António, Prior of Crato. Philip II of Spain was made king, and he united both Crown of João VI and Spanish Crown to form Iberian Union. It lasted only 60 years until 1640, when the Portuguese Restoration War was initiated against Spain, and Portugal regained its independence under the Braganza dynasty.

In the 18th century, wars were very often between the major kingdoms and Portugal and Spain always found themselves on the opposite sides. The Portuguese, courtesy of their long-standing alliance, aligned themselves with Great Britain, while Spain, through the Pacte de Famille, allied themselves to France. In 1762, during the Seven Years' War, Spain launched an unsuccessful invasion of Portugal.

In 1777, there was a conflict between the two states over the borders of their possessions in South America.

During Napoleonic Era, in 1807, the king of Spain and his French allies invaded Portugal, using a route that crossed through Spanish territory. However, the French decided to take over both countries, overthrowing the King of Spain and forcing the Portuguese royal family to escape to the Portuguese colony of Brazil.

After the fall of Napoleon, both countries came close to war a number of times during the early 19th century. Both lost their American colonies shortly after the end of the Peninsular War, which severely weakened their global power.

Major Tournaments

1934 FIFA World Cup qualification

First leg

Second leg

1950 FIFA World Cup qualification

First leg
Spain and Portugal met in 1950 FIFA World Cup qualification round with Spain going away with a 5-1 victory at home.

Second leg
Second leg saw both sides drawing 2-2, meaning Spain qualified for 1950 FIFA World Cup after defeating Portugal 5-1 in first leg.

UEFA Euro 1984
In UEFA Euro 1984 group stage Portugal and Spain were paired together, both sides qualified to the next round as Portugal drew Spain 1-1. António Sousa gave Portugal in 52nd minute, after 21 minutes Santillana equalised for Spain at 73rd minute.

UEFA Euro 2004
Portugal and Spain faced off in group stage of UEFA Euro 2004 hosted by Portugal. Portugal won the game 1-0 as half time substitute Nuno Gomes scored a goal from 20 yards, giving Portugal their first ever victory against Spain in a major tournament, this was also Portugal's first victory over Spain since 1981.

2010 FIFA World Cup
Spain defeated Portugal 1–0 in the Iberian derby to progress to the quarter finals where they were to play Paraguay. The game took place on Tuesday 29 June 2010 at the Cape Town Stadium. Spain dominated the game with a ball possession ratio of 62% and several opportunities, but had to endure a pair of missed chances by the Portuguese in the first half, including one by Hugo Almeida which nearly resulted in a goal. In the second half, the Portuguese attacking threat decreased, and the entry of Fernando Llorente for Fernando Torres on the field brought new energy to the Spanish team. The only goal of the match came on the 63rd minute: David Villa picked up a brilliant pass by Xavi, having his first shot saved, but then lifted the rebound into the roof of the net. Post-match replays showed that the goal was scored from an offside position (0.22m according to ESPN axis).

UEFA Euro 2012
Portugal faced Spain for the sixth time in a major tournament at UEFA Euro 2012 semi-finals. In early minutes of first half, Spain missed an scoring opportunity as Álvaro Arbeloa shot a half-cleared ball by Bruno Alves just above the crossbar. After a Portugal free-kick hit the wall, Spain started a counter-attack with Xavi passing the ball at the edge of the box, just to be hit above the crossbar by Andrés Iniesta. Halfway through first half Cristiano Ronaldo shot just waved past the Spanish goalkeeper Iker Casillas missing the goal by inches. In the 85th minute Portugal got two back-to-back freekicks as Ronaldo was fouled for the first one and second for handball which happened as Ronaldo hit the first freekick at the wall, the second freekick went above the bar, as the 90 minutes ended with a 0-0 scoreline. At 95th minute Portuguese keeper Rui Patrício saved a shot from Iniesta as he fired in a cross in the six yard box. As extra-time ended 0-0, the penalty shootout started, Spain went out victorious as Cristiano Ronaldo didn't take a penalty after Xabi Alonso saw Patrício saving his first penalty. After the match Portuguese coach Paulo Bento said: "We had this order. Ronaldo was fifth."

2018 FIFA World Cup
Spain faced Portugal in the second match of Group B. Cristiano Ronaldo gave Portugal an early lead from the spot-kick in 4th minute of the match after deceiving Nacho inside the box. In the 24th minute, Diego Costa equalised for Spain after scoring past the Portuguese defence. Isco then saw his shot thumping against the post. Ronaldo gave Portugal lead once again in 44th minute after Spanish keeper David de Gea was unable to handle the shot. Costa once again equalised for Spanish side in the 55th minute. Nacho redeemed himself after scoring a superb half-volley from outside the box at 58th minute. Gerard Piqué brought down Ronaldo outside the box at 86th minute, Ronaldo scored the free kick to equalise the game at 3-3, earning his first-ever World Cup hat-trick.

List of matches

Unofficial matches
An additional three matches have been played between the countries which are not considered official (although are included in some media articles relating to the rivalry and in some statistical tallies of caps for the players involved):
In May 1927, Spain played a friendly against Portugal in Madrid on the same day as they played Italy in Rome. The squad for the Italy game was more experienced and considered to be stronger, while several players in the Portugal match made their debuts; consequently the Spain team is considered to have been equivalent to its B team (although they won their match while the A team lost theirs) and thus not a full international.
Following the outbreak of the Spanish Civil War in 1936, no official matches were played by Spain until 1941. The vast majority of the squad in 1936 either originated from the Basque provinces, or played for FC Barcelona in Catalonia, both of which were initially within Republican territory in the conflict. The Basque players formed their own quasi-national team and left Spain to play a long series of exhibition matches on tour around Eastern Europe and Latin America to provide funds and exposure for local causes, and Barcelona did likewise; most of the players in both groups never returned. Back in Spain, as the Nationalist side took control of more of the country, General Franco saw the opportunity to use football as a positive propaganda tool, and arranged for a match to be played in his home region of Galicia against Portugal, whose leader Salazar was supportive of Francoist Spain. Recognition was granted by FIFA at short notice and the match took place in Vigo in November 1937. In contrast to Portugal's settled squad, the Spain pool was hastily assembled from the best available players in Nationalist areas, and Portugal won for their first victory over their neighbours. A return match was arranged for the following January in Lisbon, also won by Portugal, and which attracted attention when three local players refused to give the Roman salute before kick-off; they were initially imprisoned, but were soon released due to the political influence held by the hierarchy of the club they played for, Belenenses.

Statistics

Overall

Top goalscorers

5 Player scored 5 goals

See also
2010 FIFA World Cup
UEFA Euro 2012
Portugal–Spain relations

References

International association football rivalries
Spain national football team rivalries
Spain
Portugal at UEFA Euro 1984
Portugal at UEFA Euro 2004
Portugal at UEFA Euro 2012
Spain at UEFA Euro 1984
Spain at UEFA Euro 2004
Spain at UEFA Euro 2012